Čengić may refer to:

 Čengić, Bosnia and Herzegovina, village near Bijeljina
 Čengić (surname), South Slavic surname

See also 

 Čengići (plural)